Camela is a Spanish musical group credited with being the pioneers of the style baptised as  tecno-rumba in the 90s. Its members are Dionisio Martin Lobato (singer-composer), María de los Ángeles Muñoz Dueñas (singer-songwriter), and until February 2013, Miguel Angel Jimenez Cabrera (keyboards), all of them from the Madrid neighbourhood of San Cristóbal de los Ángeles. The group is a landmark in the Spanish popular music scene, without critics' acceptance, and hardly any support from the media, they became a massive selling success, having a great musical and sociological impact on Spanish society. Camela is the second best selling band in Spain in the past 20 years, only surpassed by La Oreja de Van Gogh.

Discography
Studio albums
 1994: Lágrimas de amor
 1995: Sueños inalcanzables
 1996: Sus 12 primeras canciones
 1997: Corazón indomable
 1998: Sólo por ti
 1999: No puedo estar sin él
 2000: Simplemente amor
 2001: Amor.com
 2003: Por siempre tú y yo
 2004: Diez de corazón
 2006: Se ciega x amor
 2007: Te prometo el universo
 2008: Laberinto de amor
 2009: Dioni, Ángeles y Miguel
 2011: La magia del amor
 2014: Más de lo que piensas
 2017: Me metí en tu corazón
 2022: Que la música te acompañe

References

External links
 Official page

Spanish musical groups
Musical groups established in 1994
1994 establishments in Spain